South Carolina Highway 225 (SC 225) is a  state highway in the U.S. state of South Carolina that travels southwest of Greenwood. The highway serves as a southwestern bypass for the city. The easternmost  of the highway is known as West Scotch Cross Road.

Route description
SC 225 begins at the U.S. Route 25 (US 25)/US 178 concurrency southeast of Greenwood. The highway swings around to the west side of the city where it ends at SC 72 Business (SC 72 Bus.).

History

The original SC 225 was established in 1940 as a new primary route, running from Waterloo to Cross Hill. The route was soon extended west to just east of Ware Shoals. In 1948, the route was downgraded.

The current SC 225 was created between 1974 and 1977 as a new route. The route originally ran from SC 72 Bus. to US 221. The route was extended slightly east to the US 25/US 178 overlap in either 1988 or 1989.

Major intersections

See also

References

External links

 
 SC 225 at Virginia Highways' South Carolina Highways Annex

225
Transportation in Greenwood County, South Carolina